Tara Davis-Woodhall (born May 20, 1999) is an American track and field athlete. She is the American junior record holder in the indoor long jump. She broke the record February 11, 2017 at the Dumanis Sports Group Prep Classic in Frisco, Texas, jumping . She placed 6th in the women's long jump final at the 2021 Summer Olympics. Davis is also a hurdler. She married long time boyfriend and Paralympian Hunter Woodhall on October 16th, 2022

High school
Later in the year, running for Agoura High School, she won three events at the CIF California State Meet.  Her win in the 100 meters hurdles in 12.83 beat the National high school record, but it was aided by a +3.7 mps wind.  Her mark is the best under all conditions in history.  She also set the state record in the long jump.  Her  beat the 24-year-old record by Olympian Marion Jones, who at the time jumped for another Marmonte League school, Thousand Oaks High School.  A few weeks earlier, she had run the hurdles in 12.89 at the Ventura County meet.  It was the second fastest wind legal race in history.  She was selected Ventura County Track and Field Athlete of the Year.

After graduating high school, she attended the University of Georgia where she was coached by Petros Kyprianou.

College
As a University of Georgia student athlete, Davis broke Klaudia Siciarz's world under-20 record in the 60 m hurdles with a time of 7.98 seconds, during the 2018 NCAA Indoor Track and Field Championships. In the same meet, she came 3rd in the long jump, completing a University of Georgia sweep. She finished behind Keturah Orji and Kate Hall.

After a season at Georgia, she transferred to the University of Texas. She did not get to compete until the 2019–2020 track season, because of transfer rules. She went on to appeal her old coach’s decision to hold her from being released from the team.

In 2021, Davis jumped 7.14 meters at the Texas Relays in Austin to set the collegiate record.  The jump placed her in the top 30 of all time.

Career

She qualified for the 2020 Summer Olympics by jumping 7.04 meters to place second at the Olympic Trials. She placed sixth in the women's long jump Olympic final.

External links

References

1999 births
Living people
American female long jumpers
American female hurdlers
Place of birth missing (living people)
American female triple jumpers
Track and field athletes from California
Georgia Lady Bulldogs track and field athletes
Texas Longhorns women's track and field athletes
United States collegiate record holders in athletics (track and field)
Athletes (track and field) at the 2020 Summer Olympics
Olympic track and field athletes of the United States